Paragonaster is a genus of echinoderms belonging to the family Pseudarchasteridae.

The genus has almost cosmopolitan distribution.

Species:

Paragonaster chinensis 
Paragonaster clarkae 
Paragonaster ctenipes 
Paragonaster felli 
Paragonaster grandis 
Paragonaster haldixoni 
Paragonaster ridgwayi 
Paragonaster stenostichus 
Paragonaster subtilis 
Paragonaster tenuiradiis

References

Pseudarchasteridae
Asteroidea genera